Norbury is a village and civil parish in the Borough of Stafford, in west Staffordshire, England. The population as taken at the 2011 census was 371.

Canal
The village gave its name to Norbury Junction, about one mile to the south-east. At one time (1835), this was a junction between the main Birmingham and Liverpool Junction Canal (later to become part of the Shropshire Union Canal) and a branch stretching south-west through Newport to link to the now-abandoned Shrewsbury Canal.

Church
The body of the Parish Church of St Peter is constructed in sandstone, dates from the 14th century, and is mainly in Decorated style.  There is a canonical sundial on the south wall. The tower, built in 1759, is in brick, and in Georgian style. The church was restored in 1826–29, when the north vestry and west gallery were added.  Inside the church are well-preserved medieval roofs, and a tomb recess containing an effigy dating from the 14th century.

Notable people 
 Roger Northburgh (probably born in Norburydied 1358) a cleric, administrator and politician who was Bishop of Coventry and Lichfield from 1321 until his death.
 Richard Barnfield (1574 in Norbury1620) an English poet with an obscure though close relationship with William Shakespeare.
 William Lloyd, Archdeacon of Durban (1802–1881) was an Anglican clergyman, brought up in Shugborough Hall; was rector of Norbury

See also
Listed buildings at Norbury, Staffordshire

References

External links

Villages in Staffordshire
Borough of Stafford
Civil parishes in Staffordshire